Microsoft Live Labs was a partnership between MSN and Microsoft Research that focused on applied research for Internet products and services at Microsoft. Live Labs was headed by Dr. Gary William Flake, who prior to joining Microsoft was a principal scientist at Yahoo! Research Lab and former head of research at the Web portal's Overture Services division.

Live Labs' focus was on applied research and practical applications of computer science areas including natural language processing, machine learning, information retrieval, data mining, computational linguistics, distributed computing, etc.

Microsoft Live Labs was formed on January 24, 2006. On October 8, 2010, Microsoft announced the shutdown of Live Labs and the transition of its remaining team of 68 to Microsoft Bing. As a consequence Live Labs' original founder and leader Dr. Gary William Flake has resigned from Microsoft.

Projects 
The following table shows all of the projects that had been initiated by Microsoft Live Labs:

See also
Windows Live

References

External links

 
Microsoft websites